The South African national cricket team toured New Zealand in February and March 2004 and played a three-match Test series against the New Zealand national cricket team. The series was tied 1–1. New Zealand were captained by Stephen Fleming and South Africa by Graeme Smith. In addition, the teams played a six-match series of One Day Internationals (ODIs) which New Zealand won 5–1.

ODI series

1st ODI

2nd ODI

3rd ODI

4th ODI

Replay

5th ODI

Replay

6th ODI

Test series

1st Test

2nd Test

3rd Test

References

External links

2004 in South African cricket
2004 in New Zealand cricket
International cricket competitions in 2003–04
2003–04 New Zealand cricket season
2004